Jack Ledru (1922 – March 2013) was a French song and operetta composer.

Biography 
Jack Ledru studied at the Conservatoire de Paris where he won a prize for piano. He began his artistic career by accompanying great singing stars: Georges Guétary, Lucienne Delyle, Suzy Delair, Charles Trenet.

He wrote instrumental and vocal parts and a ballet, le Baiser, created in Lille in 1967. He conducted the orchestras of radio, television and many theaters (Mogador, Chatelet Theatre in Paris and province).

He began writing operettas in 1954. For  he composed Mon P'tit Pote which was played more than three years on a row. For the famous entertainer, he would write Bidule (1959) and A toi de jouer (1961). In 1962, he addressed the traditional operetta by offering  Farandole d’amour.

Most of his career continued essentially in the province: C'est pas l'Pérou (1976), Quadrille Viennois where he mingled tunes by Franz von Suppé and his own compositions, and La peur des coups after Courteline, played in Tours in 1977.

In collaboration with Guy Lafarge, he composed Le Petit Café (Mulhouse, 1980) and La Cagnotte (Lille, 1983), with Paul Bonneau, La Parisienne (Tours, 1982). Finally, he brought together the music of various composers for the operetta Paris Belle Époque.

Main works 
1954: Mon p'tit pote
1959: Bidule
1961: A toi de jouer
1962: Farandole d'Amour
1964: Michel Strogoff
1967: Vienne chante et danse
1975:  La Baraka
1976: C'est pas l'Pérou
1977: Quadrille viennois
1977: La Peur des coups
1980: Le petit café
1982: La Parisienne
1983: La Cagnotte
1987: Paris Belle Époque

References

External links 
 Jack Ledru on data.bnf.fr
 Les Petits Santons on Youtube
 Biography

French operetta composers
Conservatoire de Paris alumni
1922 births
2013 deaths